Richland Center is an unincorporated community in Richland Township, Fulton County, Indiana, USA.

Richland Center (also spelled Richland Centre in its early years) had a post office from 1878 until 1902.

Geography

References

Unincorporated communities in Fulton County, Indiana
Unincorporated communities in Indiana